Lake Lone Chimney owned by the Tri-County Development Authority, is in Pawnee County, Oklahoma, east of Glencoe. The lake, whose dam is also known as Lower Black Bear Creek Watershed Dam 19M, also extends into southern Payne County, Oklahoma. It was built in 1980 by the Tri-County Development Authority, Pawnee County Conservancy District and the Black Bear Conservancy District, assisted by the Oklahoma Conservation Commission and the USDA Natural Resources Conservation Service (NRCS) Watershed Protection and Flood Protection Program.

Purposes

The dam was originally designed as part of a regional flood control project of the Lower Black Bear Creek Watershed, which included nineteen flood control dams. During the period of 1935-1954, before the dams were built, there had been seven major floods and 73 smaller floods.

Before the Lone Chimney Lake was built, the design was altered to include  of municipal water storage. The lake became the primary source of water for the small communities of Glencoe, Morrison, Yale, Blackburn, Skeede, Maramec and Terlton, Oklahoma. It is a secondary source for the larger towns of Cleveland and Pawnee, Oklahoma.

Impact of drought

Lone Chimney Lake has been plagued by drought-related problems for nearly a decade. It was nearly drained of municipal water in 2006, when high consumption caused the fixed intake valve to be above the lake's surface. It had to be replaced with a floating valve. The cost was about $19,000, but allowed the lake management to continue supplying its customers.

The OWRB reported in December, 2011, that Lone Chimney again had to implement forced rationing because the reservoir was critically short of water. In June 2012, the City of Stillwater agreed to sell the Lone Chimney Water Association Up  of treated water per month for 30 years.

One of the water intakes was above the water level, while the other was partially above the line. By January 14, 2014, a television newscast reported that the lake was within a few weeks of running out of water.

However, the level must rise several more feet before the boat ramps can be used again. The fishing piers are still well above the water level and the land around them has been overgrown with brush that must be cleared. The Lone Chimney water treatment plant, closed several years ago, has not been restarted. That plant used a chloramine treatment process, whereas the Stillwater plant uses a chlorination process. The water treatment board must decide whether to convert the existing plant to achlorination, or to treat Stillwater's product to remove something compatible with the chloramine process.

Notes

References

See also
Black Bear Creek
Black Bear Creek Watershed Management Plan. Pawnee Nation Department of Environmental Conservation and Safethy. CWA 319 Nonpoint Source Pollution Project.2012

Infrastructure in Oklahoma
Reservoirs in Oklahoma
Buildings and structures completed in 1980